The 2023 Four Continents Figure Skating Championships took place at the Broadmoor World Arena from February 7–12, 2023, in Colorado Springs, Colorado, in the United States. Medals were awarded in the disciplines of men's singles, women's singles, pairs, and ice dance. Nations from non-European countries could send 3 entries at most for every discipline.

Qualification

Age and minimum TES requirements 
The competition was open to skaters from all non-European member nations of the International Skating Union. The corresponding competition for European skaters was the 2023 European Championships.

Skaters were eligible for the 2023 Four Continents Championships if they turned 15 years of age before July 1, 2022, and met the minimum technical elements score requirements. The ISU accepts scores if they were obtained at senior-level ISU-recognized international competitions during the ongoing season at least 21 days before the first official practice day of the championships or during the preceding season.

Entries
Member nations began announcing their selections in December 2022. The International Skating Union published a complete list of entries on January 18, 2023.

Changes to preliminary assignments

Medal summary

Medalists 
Medals awarded to the skaters who achieve the highest overall placements in each discipline:

Small medals awarded to the skaters who achieve the highest short program or rhythm dance placements in each discipline:

Small medals awarded to the skaters who achieve the highest free skating or free dance placements in each discipline:

Medals by country 
Table of medals for overall placement:

Table of small medals for placement in the short/rhythm segment:

Table of small medals for placement in the free segment:

Results

Men

Women

Pairs

Ice dance

References 

Four Continents Figure Skating Championships
Four Continents Figure Skating Championships
Four Continents Figure Skating Championships
Four Continents Figure Skating Championships
International figure skating competitions hosted by the United States
Sports competitions in Colorado Springs, Colorado